The Bridge Round House is a diner located at the southeastern end of the Golden Gate Bridge, adjacent to the tourist plaza which was renovated in 2012.  The Bridge Round House, an Art Deco design by Alfred Finnila completed in 1938, has been popular throughout the years as a starting point for various commercial tours of the bridge and an unofficial gift shop.  The diner was renovated in 2012 and the gift shop was then removed as a new, official gift shop has been included in the adjacent plaza renovations.

References

Restaurants in San Francisco
Golden Gate Bridge
Commercial buildings completed in 1938
Restaurants established in 1938
1938 establishments in California
Art Deco architecture in California
Diners in California